Petar Šimić (1932 – 12 April 1990) was an admiral of the Yugoslav Navy, Commander of the Split Military Area and Assistant Commander of the Military Naval Area for political-legal sector.

Early life
Šimić's family hailed from the village of Drivenik near Novi Vinodolski.

Role in SKJ

Before his death, Šimić served as the President of the Organization of the League of Communists in the Yugoslav People's Army, thereby acting as head of the League of Communists of Yugoslavia (SKJ) in the Yugoslav People's Army (JNA). In the late 1980s, he represented hardliners within JNA in public appearances. On 31 January 1989, he issued an announcement in which he accused some politicians of "pushing the Yugoslav ship on the rocks". Although he didn't name them at the time, it was clear that the announcement was directed at Croat and Slovene politicians, especially at Stipe Šuvar, the President of the League of Communists of Yugoslavia at the time. Šimić also added that "JNA will oppose, with all its might, anybody who wants to play dangerous games with achievements of our struggle and the socialist revolution".

At one of the sessions where fierce discussions occurred, according to official version, he suffered a stroke and died.

After the Yugoslav Wars had ended, Croatian journalist Franjo Deranja published a book, sourced mainly to Antun Tus, saying that it was probable that the Yugoslav People's Army leadership was at fault for Šimić's death.

References

Sources
 Franjo Deranja: Slučaj admirala Petra Šimića – Strogo povjerljivo (Glosa d.o.o., Rijeka, 2015.; 60 stranica, tvrdi uvez)
 

1932 births
1990 deaths
People from Bihać
Croats of Bosnia and Herzegovina
Yugoslav communists
Admirals of the Yugoslav People's Army